Juraj Vavrík (born 2 September 1991) is a Slovak footballer who currently plays as a midfielder.

Club career
In August 2011, he joined Slovak club MFK Ružomberok on a four-year contract.

References

External links
 
 MFK Ružomberok profile 

1991 births
Living people
People from Ilava
Sportspeople from the Trenčín Region
Slovak footballers
Association football midfielders
FK Dubnica players
MFK Ružomberok players
Slovak Super Liga players